Raid is a 1947 German crime film directed by Werner Klingler and starring Paul Bildt, Agathe Poschmann, and Claus Holm. It was made as a cautionary tale about the black market in postwar Berlin.

It was made in the Soviet Zone, which would later become East Germany. It was produced by the state-controlled DEFA and shot at the Johannisthal Studios and on location around Berlin. The film's sets were designed by the art directors Otto Hunte and Bruno Monden.

The picture sold more than 8,090,000 tickets.

Plot
The film takes place in Berlin, in the direct aftermath of Germany's defeat in the Second World War.

The black market is rife in the ruined city. Chief Inspector Friedrich Naumann (Paul Bildt) organizes a raid on the "Ali Baba Club", a suspected center of a black market gang, but the raid fails due to the gang having an informer in the police ranks. Later, Naumann investigates alone, discovers a secret tunnel in the club, and gets murdered.

The plot then thickens around the complicated relationships between Goll (Harry Frank) - club owner and gang boss; the singer Yvonne (Nina Kosta), Goll's employee and accomplice; Heinz Becker, Naumann's colleague who had been blackmailed into acting as an informant; and Paul Naumann (Friedhelm von Petersson), the inspector's son, a recently returned Prisoner of War who works as a driver in Goll's drug pushing ring until realizing that it was Goll who murdered his father.

In the cataclysmic conclusion, the police manages to carry out another raid, a successful one this time, round up members of the gang and undo Goll's dark machinations.

At the time, Berlin - where the film is set and where it was also filmed - was under complete four-power occupation, and the rival German Democratic Republic and German Federal Republic had not yet been set up. Still, the situation of occupation is in this film pushed to the background, with all characters, positive and negative, being Germans and the conflict in the film being between German police and German criminals.

Cast

References

Bibliography

External links
 

1947 films
1947 crime films
German crime films
East German films
1940s German-language films
Films set in Berlin
German black-and-white films
Films directed by Werner Klingler
Films shot at Johannisthal Studios
Black markets
1940s German films